Katarina Boshoff (born 8 October 1980 as Katarina Cristina Boshoff) is a South African folk pop singer and pianist based in Cape Town.

Boshoff was born in Stellenbosch, and holds dual citizenship in South Africa and Spain. She began playing piano at the age of 12, and received her first recording contract at the age of 18. Katarina is partly South African, partly Dutch.

Music
Boshoff released her debut single, "I'm only human" in 1999. The single topped the South African National Campus Charts. It spent 9 weeks on the South African National Top 40 Charts, where it peaked at the number six position. In 2000 she followed the single with her debut album, This is me.

Studio albums
 This is me (2000)
 Fire & Ice (2014)
 Me and Missy D. (2015)

Singles
 "I'm only human" (1999)
 "You're my shoulder" (2000)
 "I feel like a wreck" (2003)
 "Try" (2010)
 "A Rainy Day" (2014)
 "Tears of an Angel" (2014)
 "Why" (2014)
 "I dare you" (2015)
 "Gonna be with you" (2015)
 "Dreams" (2014)

References

External links
Official Music Website

1980 births
21st-century South African women singers
Living people
Musicians from Cape Town
South African emigrants to Spain
South African people of Dutch descent
South African pianists
South African pop singers
South African women singer-songwriters
White South African people
21st-century pianists
21st-century women pianists